Tsiu Keng is a village in North District, Hong Kong.

Administration
Tsiu Keng is a recognized village under the New Territories Small House Policy. It is one of the villages represented within the Sheung Shui District Rural Committee. For electoral purposes, Tsiu Keng is part of the Sheung Shui Rural constituency, which is currently represented by Simon Hau Fuk-tat.

History
At the time of the 1911 census, the population of Tsiu Keng was 43. The number of males was 15.

References

External links

 Delineation of area of existing village Tsiu Keng (Sheung Shui) for election of resident representative (2019 to 2022)

Villages in North District, Hong Kong